Richard McGraw (March 19, 1955 – November 1, 1985) was an American professional wrestler, best known for his appearances with the World Wrestling Federation (WWF) under the ring name "Quickdraw" Rick McGraw from 1980 until his death in 1985. Rick was a wrestler at Elon College 1973-74.

Professional wrestling career
McGraw began his career in 1975 in the Florida area. He adopted the nickname "Quickdraw" in reference to the cartoon character Quick Draw McGraw. He competed in the Mid-Atlantic region a couple of years later before entering the World Wrestling Federation. McGraw defeated enhancement talent, but mostly put over heels that were ready to challenge WWF champion Bob Backlund. He also competed on the Showdown at Shea show in August 1980, losing to Greg Gagne.

McGraw left the WWF and competed for various regional territories of the National Wrestling Alliance. He was one-half of The New York Dolls with The Dream Machine (managed by Jimmy Hart) in the World Wrestling Association, winning the WWA World Tag Team Championship in 1982. Rick then re-entered Vince McMahon Sr.'s WWF as part of the tag team called The Carolina Connection with Steve Travis. Quickdraw had notable matches with numerous top heels during his time in the WWF. He was once managed by Arnold Skaaland and also had his neck "broken" by Killer Khan in a match. Towards the end of his career, McGraw teamed up with André the Giant to form a lopsided tag team duo: McGraw was 5'7" with the Giant billed at 7'4".

On the October 26, 1985 episode of WWF Championship Wrestling, McGraw was a guest on Roddy Piper's "Piper's Pit" segment and got on the host's case about always shooting his mouth off and not wrestling on television, prompting Piper to accept a challenge to wrestle him on the show the next week. During his entrance, Piper repeated "I'm going to show you why they don't let me wrestle on TV." McGraw wore Piper's signature "Hot Rod" T-shirt to the ring before blowing his nose on it and throwing it at Piper to start the match. Piper quickly took control, throwing McGraw out of the ring and twice into the guardrail. After no-selling several punches and kicks in McGraw's comeback, Piper hit him with a swinging neckbreaker and two DDTs, the second prompting the referee to stop the match, declaring McGraw unable to continue. Piper stomped him a few times then yelled into a camera, "That's why they don't let me wrestle on TV!" Coincidentally, the unusually violent match (taped October 22) aired the morning after McGraw died, leading some viewers to assume Piper killed him. Off TV, McGraw had at least three matches in the interim, with The Spoiler, Randy Savage and Mike Sharpe.

Personal life
McGraw was married to Lisa. The couple had a single child, Ricky.

Death
McGraw died of a heart attack on November 1, 1985. Shortly after, Roddy Piper headlined a show held to benefit McGraw's family. Fellow professional wrestler Bret Hart noted in his autobiography that McGraw regularly consumed Placidyl and suggested this resulted in his heart failing. He is buried at Evergreen Cemetery in North Carolina.

Championships and accomplishments 
Continental Championship Wrestling
NWA Alabama Heavyweight Championship (1 time)
Lutte Internationale
Canadian International Tag Team Championship (1 time) - with Gino Brito
Pro Wrestling Illustrated
Ranked #485 of the top 500 singles wrestlers of the "PWI Years" in 2003
World Wrestling Association
WWA World Tag Team Championship (1 time) - with Troy Graham

See also
 List of premature professional wrestling deaths

References

External links 
 
 

1955 births
1985 deaths
20th-century American male actors
American male professional wrestlers
The First Family (professional wrestling) members
Professional wrestlers from North Carolina
Stampede Wrestling alumni
20th-century professional wrestlers